Frea flavicollis is a species of beetle in the family Cerambycidae. It was described by Per Olof Christopher Aurivillius in 1914.

References

flavicollis
Beetles described in 1914